Gymnopilus tenuis is a species of mushroom in the family Hymenogastraceae.

See also

List of Gymnopilus species

External links
Gymnopilus tenuis at Index Fungorum

tenuis
Taxa named by William Alphonso Murrill